Ozrinići is a historical tribe and region in Montenegro. During the Ottoman period, it was one of the largest tribe of the Katunska nahija, one of the four territorial units of Old Montenegro.

History
The first reference to the Ozrinići comes from a letter issued by the Serbian Chancellery in Dubrovnik in 1411. The document, a complaint from Ragusan people addressed to Jelena Balšić, is about the looting committed by the Ozrinići, together with the Bjelopavlići, Maznice and Malonšići, on Ragusan merchants on their way through Zeta while they were returning from Serbia.

The Ozrinići are mentioned again in the 1489 charter of Ivan Crnojević, then in the 1570–1571 defter of the Sandjak of Peć. Five families of the Ozrinići founded the settlement of Ozrinići in the Nikšić area in 1597.

During the Ottoman period, from the 16th up to the end of the 18th century, the Ozrinići were the largest tribe of the Katunska nahija, one of the four territorial units of Old Montenegro.

In 1829, the Ozrinići and Cuce had an armed conflict against neighboring Bjelice. Petar I Petrović-Njegoš sent Sima Milutinović Sarajlija and Mojsije to negotiate peace among them.

Anthropology
According to Kovijanić, the Ozrinići were an old Serb tribe. Their founder was Ozro, who moved from Zeta and his descendants formed the Ozrinići tribe. Ozrinići included the villages of Barjamovica, Velestovo, Markovina, Maklen, Čevo, Ploča, Lastva, Ožegovići. All Ozrinići celebrate the slava (feast) of Aranđelovdan (Michael).

Notable people

Milena Vukotić
Sula Radov Radulović
Janko Vukotić
Dušan Vukotić
Momčilo Vukotić
Petar Vukotić
Vito Nikolić
Živko Nikolić
Milo Đukanović
Aco Đukanović
Željko Šturanović
Žarko Varajić
Vojo Gardašević
Blažo Perutović
Rođa Raičević
Pop Milo Jovović
Brano Mićunović
Dragoljub Mićunović
Peko Pavlović
Dušan Spasojević
Andrija Drašković
Branko Radulović (Montenegrin politician)
Saša Radulović

References

Sources

 

Ottoman period in the history of Montenegro
Principality of Montenegro
Cetinje Municipality
Tribes of Montenegro